The Rural Municipality of Whitemouth is a rural municipality located in southeastern Manitoba. 

Communities
 Darwin
 Elma
 River Hills
 Seven Sisters Falls
 Whitemouth

Demographics 

References

External links

 Official website
  Manitoba Historical Society: Rural Municipality of Whitemouth
 Geographic Names of Manitoba (pg. 294) - the Millennium Bureau of Canada

Rural municipalities in Manitoba